Symphorien Casimir Joseph Edouard Boitelle (23 February 1813 – 22 November 1897) was a French soldier, administrator, chief of the Paris police, deputy and senator.

Early years

Symphorien Casimir Joseph Edouard Boitelle was born in Fontaine-Notre-Dame, Nord, on 23 February 1813.
His parents were Casimir Joseph Boitelle (born c. 1783) and Marguerite Huguet (born c. 1787).
He entered the École spéciale militaire de Saint-Cyr on 2 December 1833.
In 1835 he became a second lieutenant in the 5th Lancers cavalry regiment.
On 26 October 1842 he was removed from active duty due to temporary infirmities.
On 10 March 1845 he married Amélie Caroline Guillaumine Mina Haussmann (1823–1869).
Their children were Olivier (1848–1918), Jules (born 1851) and Gabrielle (born 1853). 
He resigned from the army in April 1845.

Administrator

On 10 December 1851 Boitelle was appointed sub-prefect of Clamecy, Nièvre, but he did not take up the post.
On 1 February 1852 he was appointed sub-prefect of Saint-Quentin.
He was made Knight of the Legion of Honour on 1 January 1853.
He was appointed Prefect of Aisne on 4 March 1853.
He was Prefect of Yonne from 8 September 1856.
In the winter of 1856–57 Boitelle and Deluns-Montaud picked a quarrel while at a masked ball, and fought a duel on the Bois de Boulogne while still dressed as Harlequin and Pierrot.
Boitelle was run through the chest with a sword, and at first thought to be dead, but recovered.
The duel was the subject of paintings and plays.

Boitelle was made Prefect of Police of Paris on 16 March 1858, replacing Pierre Marie Pietri, who had resigned after the attack of Orsini.
He was promoted to Officer of the Legion of Honour of 23 August 1858.
He was entrusted with general direction of public security by an imperial decree.
He was made a grand officer of the Legion of Honour on 14 August 1862.
In 1863 Boitelle set up a service to inspect factories and suppress those that were thought to be harming a neighborhood, particularly those where public complaints were made about the smells.
In September 1863 Boitelle said he was generally satisfied with relations between the church and the state, which were engaged in a power struggle at the time.

Political career

Boitelle was elected deputy in the Corps législatif as the official candidate for the 7th constituency of Nord in the second round of voting on 15 June 1863.
He won 15,429 votes against 14,953 for the opposition candidate, M. Stiévenart-Béthune.
The election was cancelled due to serious abuses in favour of Boitelle during the campaign.
In a rerun on 6 March 1864 Stiévenart-Béthune won by 16,159 votes against 13,429 for Boitelle.

Boitelle left the prefecture of Police when he was made senator on 20 February 1866.
He was succeeded as Prefect of Police by Joseph-Marie Piétri, former prefect of the Nord department.
Boitelle held office until the end of the Second French Empire on 4 September 1870.
He died at his home in Paris on 22 November 1897.
He was buried in the family tomb in the 4th division of the Père Lachaise Cemetery.

Publications

Boitelle edited several reports, including:

Notes

Sources

1813 births
1897 deaths
École Spéciale Militaire de Saint-Cyr alumni
Prefects of France
French Senators of the Second Empire
Bonapartists
Grand Officiers of the Légion d'honneur
Burials at Père Lachaise Cemetery
Prefects of police of Paris